The United Communist Party (UCP; ; Ob'yedinonnaya kommunisticheskaya partiya, OKP) is a communist party in Russia created at the founding congress in Moscow on 15 March 2014.

The founding congress  
In March 2014 91 delegates (including 28 women) from 46 Russian regions participated at the Congress. The average age of the Congress delegates was 40 years old. The youngest delegate was born in 1996.
Among the Congress delegates there were members of the Interregional Association of the Communists, the Left Front, the Revolutionary Workers' Party, the Russian Communist Party, the Communist Party, the Union of Communist Youth, a number of free trade unions and other left-wing organizations and non-partisans.
The Congress approved the program and the Charter of UCP and the party symbols. It elected the Central Committee and the Central Auditing Commission. Vladimir Lakeev (Moscow) was elected the First Secretary of the Central Committee of the OCP."Creating the UCP reflected the need for organizational unification of all who stand in positions of scientific communism in favor of socialism, democracy, internationalism and secularism, the party is not opposed to the other working-class parties, the proletarian movement is not customized for any sectarian principles. The party aims at the development of class consciousness in the masses of workers and the organization of their struggle for power.The immediate task of the Party is the intensification of the struggle of the working people - the working class and its allies - for their political and economic rights and interests.The UCP organizes its activities based on the principle of democratic centralism, the party of ideas of community and camaraderie".

The Second Congress of the UCP 
The second Congress of the UCP was held in Moscow in November 2016.

The Third Congress of the United Communist Party 

The Third Congress of the United Communist Party was held on 9 February 2019 in the city of Moscow, due to the decision of the Sixth Plenum of the Central Committee of the Party.

At the Congress there were reports presented of the Central Committee and the Central Auditing Commission of the UCP, and the Congress discussed amendments to the Program and the Charter of UCP. Additionally, the elections of new structures of the bodies were held. The Congress discussed the situation in the country, the world communist movement, and the party. On the eve of the Congress, a report-election campaign was announced in all party groups, which was held in September–December 2018.

Expansion
The UCP aspires for unity among socialist forces in Russia. In 2018 another left-wing Russian party, New Communist Movement, merged with the UCP.

Criticism
Political analyst Sean Guillory wrote about the radical Left in Russia on the eve of the Russian presidential election in May 2018. In this section of Russian politics he included a range of organisations, which included the United Communist Party. Guillory stated that he sees the radical Left in Russia (including the United Communist Party) as limited by a number of factors. These include state repression, ideological differences (particularly the Ukrainian question), a generational divide and a lack of money.

Despite their aspiration to develop a parallel media that is representative of “the majority of the Russian population” the Russian left Guillory argues are “resource poor.”

There is, according to Guillory a clear generational divide within the Russian Left that has a detrimental effect on the United Communist Party. Older parties such as the UCP identify with the Soviet Union with a membership and support base that “tends to be older, even elderly”. Newer groups don’t employ as much Soviet Union symbolism and have members and supporters who are younger. Young Russians who start to develop a class consciousness and interest in political affairs are attracted to the newer groups. Failure to attract younger members and supporters has a terminal effect. This further accelerates the decline of the older Russian left organisations.

References

External links
Official website

2014 establishments in Russia
Communist parties in Russia
Far-left politics in Russia
Political parties established in 2014
Political organizations based in Russia